Sonder is the second studio album by Irish singer-songwriter Dermot Kennedy, released on 18 November 2022 through Riggins Recording, Interscope Records and Island Records. Originally scheduled to be released on 23 September 2022, its release was delayed twice: first to 4 November, then 18 November, with the latter due to the UK postal strike. The album was preceded by the singles "Better Days", "Something to Someone" and "Kiss Me", with "Innocence and Sadness" and "Dreamer" also released prior to the album. Kennedy will tour Europe, the UK and North America in 2023 in support of the record.

Background and recording
Kennedy worked on the album in New York City. The title is a neologism referring to the "realisation that each random passerby is living a life as vivid and complex as your own". The ballad "Innocence and Sadness" was recorded in one take.

Singles
The single "Better Days" was released on 28 July 2021 and reached number four on the Irish Singles Chart and the top 20 on the UK Singles Chart. "Something to Someone" was promoted as the lead single and released on 5 May 2022, reaching number two in Ireland. "Kiss Me" was released on 2 September 2022 and peaked at number four on the Irish Singles Chart. The tracks "Dreamer" and "Innocence and Sadness" were also issued prior to the album and both reached the top 20 in Ireland.

Critical reception

Barney Harsent of The Arts Desk called the album "crowd-pleasing, high-polish pop" with "sparse accompaniments hiding in the wings giving Kennedy's voice the spotlight and space to fire up the feels", but felt "none of it screams raw emotion. [...] It's music almost completely devoid of edge, almost impressively so". Harsent concluded that while it "does exactly what you'd expect", he found himself "wishing it did something else". Lauren Murphy of The Irish Times described Sonder as "another record of solid emotional pop songs that run the gamut from heartache to cautious optimism" although neither Kennedy's "musical nor his lyrical themes have developed in any groundbreaking manner since his 2018 debut Without Fear". While Murphy felt that it will "matter little to Kennedy's established fan base", "it comes across as a missed opportunity to prove his worth as a songwriter with original ideas rather than a one-trick pony".

Track listing

Notes
  signifies a co-producer
  signifies an additional producer
  signifies a vocal producer

Personnel
Musicians

 Dermot Kennedy – vocals (all tracks), piano (tracks 1, 2, 5, 7, 10, 11), guitar (3, 11)
 Jonah Shy – synthesizer (1, 2, 7, 10, 11); guitar, programming (1, 2, 10, 11); drum programming (1, 7, 10, 11), Rhodes (1), drums (2), piano (2, 10)
 Scott Harris – bass, guitar (2); piano (4), synthesizer (7)
 Todd Clark – background vocals (3)
 Chris Laws – drum programming (3)
 Stephen Kozmeniuk – drums, guitar, keyboards (3)
 Mark Schick – guitar (3)
 Dave Cohen – Hammond B3, piano (3)
 Steve Mac – keyboards (3)
 Dan Pursey – percussion (3)
 Ryan Linvill – drum programming, saxophone (4, 5, 9); synthesizer (4, 5), acoustic guitar (4), guitar (5), synthesizer programming (9)
 Daniel Nigro – drum programming, piano (4, 5, 9); acoustic guitar, Mellotron (4); background vocals, bass (5, 9); percussion, synthesizer (5); keyboards (9)
 Kenny Beats – drum programming, synthesizer (7)
 Cass Lowe – background vocals, drums, guitar, piano, programming, synthesizer (8)
 Emile Haynie – drums, programming, synthesizer (8)
 Chappell Roan – background vocals (9)
 Steve Solomon –drum programming, guitar, piano, programming, synthesizer (11) 
 David Hodges – drum programming, guitar, piano, programming, synthesizer (11)

Technical

 Randy Merrill – mastering
 Matty Green – mixing (1, 2, 4, 9, 11), engineering (9)
 Mark "Spike" Stent – mixing (3, 8)
 Jamie Snell – mixing (5–7, 10)
 Mitch McCarthy – mixing (9)
 Matt Wolach – mix engineering (3)
 Kyle Haas – engineering (1, 10)
 Jonah Shy – engineering (2, 7, 11)
 Chris Laws – engineering (3)
 Dan Pursey – engineering (3)
 Ryan Linvill – engineering (4, 5, 9)
 Jake Libassi – engineering (5)
 Ed McEntee – engineering (11)
 Carey Willetts – vocal engineering (9)

Charts

References

2022 albums
Albums produced by Dan Nigro
Albums produced by Steve Mac
Dermot Kennedy albums
Interscope Records albums
Island Records albums